Satlyk (Satlıq) is a rural locality (a village) in Novokulevsky Selsoviet, Nurimanovsky District, Bashkortostan, Russia. The population was 80 as of 2010. There is 1 street.

Geography 
Satlyk is located 24 km south of Krasnaya Gorka (the district's administrative centre) by road. Uyankul is the nearest rural locality.

References 

Rural localities in Nurimanovsky District